Umpqua Community College (UCC) is a public community college near Roseburg, Oregon. The college has sixteen campus buildings located on  bordering the North Umpqua River. The campus also features a track, tennis courts, and an outdoor pool. In 2009, a vineyard was added to the campus. About 3,300 full-time students and 16,000 part-time students attend UCC. Umpqua Community College serves the greater Douglas County region with the exception of Reedsport and its immediate area along the Oregon Coast.

History

In the late 1950s, interested community members formed a committee, sponsored by the American Association of University Women, to explore the idea of establishing a community college in Douglas County. After visiting other campuses, the group wrote a report, and in 1960 the Chamber of Commerce formed an Education Committee with Wayne Crooch as its chair. In February 1960, the Roseburg School Board was asked to approve a program of lower-division college courses. The request was approved and an agreement was established with Southern Oregon College (now Southern Oregon University) and the Oregon University System. Harry Jacoby, assistant Superintendent of the Roseburg School District, was named coordinator of the project.

The first college courses were offered in 1961. Classes were first held in rented facilities in Roseburg. The cost was $5 per term and $11 per credit.

After meeting the legal requirements for forming a college district, the Oregon State Board of Higher Education ordered establishment of the proposed district on December 11, 1962. Voters supported formation of the district by voting 3,190 "yes" and 825 "no" on March 30, 1964.  The same election also established the first seven-member board of directors.  At the first board meeting on April 2, 1964, Ralph Snyder was appointed registrar and Harry Jacoby was hired as the first president of the college.

The land for the campus,  of pasture land along a bend in the North Umpqua River, was donated by Elton and Ruth Jackson. The board accepted the site in February 1965. College construction was funded by a serial levy passed in May 1965 and a bond issue passed in 1968. Additional financing came from interest earnings, state funding, and federal grants. Classes were first held on "Phase I" of the new campus in Fall 1967.

In September 2010, the school started construction on a $6.7 million viticulture and enology education facility that became the home of the school's Southern Oregon Wine Institute. 
Opened in 2012, the 22,000 square-foot building was named the Danny Lang Teaching, Learning and Event Center. 
The winemaking facility has the capacity to produce roughly 3,000 cases and features a gravity flow crush pad and temperature controlled cellar.  SOWI also boasts of its "incubator program" which helps startup wineries reduce substantial upfront costs by leasing out space and equipment.  
 
On October 1, 2015, a mass shooting occurred on the school campus. Ten people, including the gunman, a 26-year-old UCC student, were killed; seven to nine others were wounded. The shooter killed himself following a brief gun battle with police.

The Athletics department was established in 1967 and joined the Oregon Community College Athletic Association (now the Northwest Athletic Conference) for competition with its first sport, men’s basketball. Today, the athletics department offers baseball, men's and women’s basketball, cross country, esports, obstacle course racing (the only junior college to offer scholarship competition in obstacle course racing), women's soccer, track and field, women’s volleyball, and men’s and women's wrestlingUCC’s campus added the Bonnie J. Ford Health, Nursing & Science Center in September of 2016. The 35,000 square foot center replaced UCC’s decades old science building. The building features state of the art labs and classrooms and industry standard simulation floors to give UCC’s Nursing and Dental Assisting students the closest on-the-job experience possible.

UCC also houses the Paul Morgan Observatory, designed and built by UCC professor Dr. Paul Morgan in 2016 as part of the beginning astronomy program and community outreach. It provides onsite and online viewings of the Sun and night sky and is the only public observatory in Southern Oregon and the only all-digital observatory in the Pacific Northwest.

Students interested in pursuing automotive, welding, and apprenticeship technologies have access to the latest technology and educational resources since the renovation of UCC's Lockwood Hall.  

In March of 2018, Tapʰòytʰaʼ Hall was added to the UCC campus. Replacing the previous Snyder Hall, Tapʰòytʰaʼ is an upgraded classroom, office and study building that has received award recognition by the Portland chapter of the American Institute of Architects for its design. The name Tapʰòytʰaʼ (pronounced duh-POY-tuh) translates as “be blessed and to prosper” in the Takelma language which was spoken by the local indigenous Latgawa, Takelma and Cow Creek Band of Umpqua Indians.

UCC is one of the 17 member colleges of the Oregon Community College Association. UCC offers a wide variety of associate degrees and certifications; including non-credit licensure, GEDs, and community education classes. As an Oregon public community college, many associate degrees earned by students are also transfer degrees. These transfer degrees allow students to transfer to one of Oregon’s 7 public universities as a junior in an undergraduate program. Additionally, UCC has developed specialized articulation partnerships with some 4-year universities including Oregon State University, Southern Oregon University, and Bushnell University.

Notable alumni
Bruce Hanna, American politician and businessman, served as a Republican member of the Oregon House of Representatives. Co-speaker of the House for the 2011–2012 session.
Hyrum Harris, New Zealand professional basketball player for the Hawke's Bay Hawks of the National Basketball League.
Gary Leif, American politician and businessman, served as a Republican member of the Oregon House of Representatives.
Alek Skarlatos, one of three Americans who tackled the perpetrator of the attempted Thalys train attack in France in 2015.
 Tamina Snuka, American professional wrestler, former WWE women's tag team champion.
 ZZ Ward, Billboard charts number 1 Blues Albums charting American singer-songwriter.

See also
 List of colleges and universities in Oregon

References

External links

 

1964 establishments in Oregon
Community colleges in Oregon
Buildings and structures in Roseburg, Oregon
Education in Douglas County, Oregon
Educational institutions established in 1964
Universities and colleges accredited by the Northwest Commission on Colleges and Universities